The Salem State Vikings are the athletic teams that represent Salem State University. The Vikings compete in NCAA Division III sports competition primarily as members of the Massachusetts State Collegiate Athletic Conference (MASCAC). The Salem State Vikings are also members of the Little East Conference (LEC) in Field Hockey, Men’s and Women’s Tennis, and Men’s Lacrosse, along with the New England Hockey Conference (NEHC) in Women’s Ice Hockey.

Teams

Baseball

Basketball

Men's

Women's

Ice Hockey

Men's

Women's

Soccer

Men's

Women's

Lacrosse

Men's

Women's

Tennis

Men's

Women's

References

Salem State Vikings